Serhiivka may refer to the following places in Ukraine:

Chernihiv Oblast
Serhiivka, Chernihiv Oblast.

Dnipropetrovsk Oblast
Serhiivka, Dnipro Raion, Dnipropetrovsk Oblast;
Serhiivka, Apostolove urban hromada, Kryvyi Rih Raion, Dnipropetrovsk Oblast;
Serhiivka, Devladove rural hromada, Kryvyi Rih Raion, Dnipropetrovsk Oblast;
Serhiivka, Nikopol Raion, Dnipropetrovsk Oblast;
Serhiivka, Pavlohrad Raion, Dnipropetrovsk Oblast.

Khmelnytskyi Oblast
Serhiivka, Khmelnytskyi Oblast.

Kirovohrad Oblast
Serhiivka, Kirovohrad Oblast.

Luhansk Oblast
Serhiivka, Luhansk Oblast.

Odesa Oblast
Serhiivka, Serhiivka settlement hromada, Bilhorod-Dnistrovskyi Raion, Odesa Oblast;
Serhiivka, Kulevcha rural hromada, Bilhorod-Dnistrovskyi Raion, Odessa Oblast;
Serhiivka, Kodyma urban hromada, Podilsk Raion, Odessa Oblast;
Serhiivka, Liubashivka settlement hromada, Podilsk Raion, Odessa Oblast.

Poltava Oblast
Serhiivka, Poltava Oblast.

Sumy Oblast
Serhiivka, Sumy Oblast.

Volyn Oblast
Serhiivka, Volyn Oblast.

Zaporizhzhia Oblast
Serhiivka, Mykhailivka rural hromada, Zaporizhzhia Raion, Zaporizhzhia Oblast;
Serhiivka, Novomykolaivka settlement hromada, Zaporizhzhia Raion, Zaporizhzhia Oblast.

Zhytomyr Oblast
Serhiivka, Zhytomyr Oblast.

See also
 Sergeyevka